Flux-corrected transport (FCT) is a conservative shock-capturing scheme for solving Euler equations and other hyperbolic equations which occur in gas dynamics, aerodynamics, and magnetohydrodynamics. It is especially useful for solving problems involving shock or contact discontinuities. An FCT algorithm consists of two stages, a transport stage and a flux-corrected anti-diffusion stage. The numerical errors introduced in the first stage (i.e., the transport stage) are corrected in the anti-diffusion stage.

References
 Jay P. Boris and David L. Book, "Flux-corrected transport, I: SHASTA, a fluid transport algorithm that works", J. Comput. Phys. 11, pp. 38 (1973).

External links

Fully multidimensional flux-corrected transport algorithms for fluids

See also
 Computational fluid dynamics
 Computational magnetohydrodynamics
 Shock capturing methods
 Volume of fluid method

Computational fluid dynamics